Vivekananda High School is a secondary school in Sulibele Bangalore Rural District.

References

High schools and secondary schools in Karnataka
Schools in Bangalore Rural district